German system may refer to:

 Continental education system
 German wine classification system
 UIC classification of locomotive axle arrangements, also known as German classification